The Wissgandstöckli is a mountain of the Glarus Alps, located on the border between the Swiss cantons of Glarus and St. Gallen. It lies approximately halfway between Matt and Weisstannen.

The Riseten Pass lies to the south of the Wissgandstöckli, and carries a hiking trail between Weisstannen, in the canton of St. Gallen, and Matt, in the canton of Glarus.

References

External links
 Wissgandstöckli on Hikr

Mountains of the Alps
Mountains of Switzerland
Mountains of the canton of St. Gallen
Mountains of the canton of Glarus
Glarus–St. Gallen border